Derbyshire County Cricket Club in 1876 was the cricket season when the English club Derbyshire played their sixth season.

Hampshire replaced Nottinghamshire as the third county to play Derbyshire, together with Lancashire and Kent. Derbyshire also played their first match against an MCC side, which was to become a regular feature. Mycroft achieved 17 wickets for 103 runs  in a match which remains a record match analysis for Derbyshire.
 
The season was clouded with the death in a railway accident of Frederick Thornhill after just one chance to play for the county.

1876 season

All Derbyshire's matches were first class in the 1876 season. They played six county games, two each against Lancashire, Kent and Hampshire, and one match against MCC. Derbyshire lost both games against Lancashire, but were honours even with Kent and Hampshire, and beat MCC at Lords.

The captain for the year was Robert Smith. The side was well established but had three newcomers. Frederick Keeton, a licensed victualler, played the first of several seasons for Derbyshire and Amos Hind a framework knitter, also made his debut, to play one more season in 1877. Frederick Thornhill, a railway worker, played a single match for the club in June, but a month later on 23 July 1876 died at Toton Sidings, the largest marshalling yards of the Midland Railway. Three players who took part in Derbyshire's first match played their last season for Derbyshire, each appearing in one game. These were  Unwin Sowter,  John Burnham and John Tilson.

In the first match against Lancashire, Lancashire made 163 in their first innings, and Derbyshire replied with 60. They had to follow on, and achieving 78 in the second innings, lost by an innings. In the second match, their first against Hampshire Derbyshire scored 179 in the first innings and Hampshire made 98 in response and had to follow-on. Hampshire scored 156 in the second innings and Derbyshire made the necessary 80 with 8 wickets in hand. Against MCC Derbyshire opened with 229 with a contribution of 77 from Hind. MCC replied with 104 and managed 76 in the follow-on to give Derbyshire an innings victory. Against Kent, Derbyshire scored 107 in the first innings and Kent replied with 121. Derbyshire's second innings score of 170 set a target Kent could not achieve and they finished on 113 to give Derbyshire 43 run victory. In the second match against Lancashire, Derbyshire replied with 63 to Lancashire's 111. In the second innings Lancashire made 172 and Derbyshire ended the second innings 95 runs behind on 125. In the second match against Kent, Derbyshire made 147 in the first innings and Kent made 145. In the second innings Derbyshire made 112, and Kent were able to make the necessary 116 to win the match with two wickets in hand.  In the last match against Hampshire, Derbyshire opened with 115 and Hampshire made 63 in reply. In the second innings Derbyshire made 91, but Hampshire went on to make 145 to win with one wicket in hand.  Mycroft achieved a record match analysis of 17 wickets for 103 runs against Hampshire in the match.

John Platts  was top scorer and William Mycroft took most wickets.

Matches

Statistics

Cricketers who played and their first-class batting performances

Smith played two matches for North v South, two for a United North of England XI v United South of England XI and one for an All England XI, giving him a first-class run total of 327.

First-class bowling averages

Mycroft played five games for MCC, one for an All England XI and one for a United North of England XI bringing his first class wicket total to 95.

Wicket Keeping
A Smith Catches 13, Stumping 1

See also
Derbyshire County Cricket Club seasons
1876 English cricket season

References

1876 in English cricket
Derbyshire County Cricket Club seasons
English cricket seasons in the 19th century